A flash is a body of water that forms where the land below it has subsided. Whilst these are mostly found in areas where mining has taken place, some can occur naturally. Collectively they are known as Flashes

History
Flash is recorded as being a dialectal word from Cheshire, which describes the water filled depressions caused by subsidence. Some have said that word was used as far back as the 17th century when describing small bodies of water across Cheshire, and was derived from a French word for puddle. Another writer states the "Flash or Plash, deriving from splash, are small puddles left over after a thunderstorm". In William Gresley's book, "A Glossary of Terms Used in Coal-Mining", Gresley states that the word originated in the salt mining districts of Cheshire and defines it as: 

Flashes are common in former mining areas such as Cheshire, Lancashire and Yorkshire, where mining has had an effect on the landscape. In Cheshire especially, rock salt and brine extraction beneath the ground has had a profound effect on the surface, creating flashes even some time after the human involvement has ended. A similar result has occurred in certain areas of Worcestershire, such as at Upton Warren, where the flash is a result of brine extraction too. 

The industrial extraction of salt, or the abstraction of it by natural causes, has a greater effect on the depth of the flashes than those in former coal mining areas. The removal of minerals is usually maintained by use of supports to stop the tunnels or caves collapsing. In coal mining, the normal procedure in the 18th, 19th and early 20th centuries was to install pit props, however, the historical industrial mining of rock salt was to use a Room and Pillar method (or Pillar and Stall) to support the roof. But when water finds its way into salt workings, it erodes the salt pillars being used to support the roof, therefore the former ceiling area collapses, and the subsidence is to a greater depth.

Brine extraction underneath the River Weaver in Cheshire accounted for the development of several lakes along the course of the river. During the Great subsidence of 1880, flashes were appearing across the salt mining district on a daily basis. One of the largest, Witton Flash in Northwich, was listed by Ordnance Survey mapping to have been created between 1890 and 1897, with a measurement of the surface water dated also. This was to indicate that the water had not finished filling the void, and the ground beneath was still in the process of settling. Along the same watercourse just upstream is Winsford, where the river filled three voids now known as the Top, Middle and Bottom Flashes. During the late 19th and early 20th century, the chemical companies mining the salt dumped waste chemicals in the flashes.

Brine and salt extraction in the Davenham area of Cheshire has also led to flashes being created on the Trent and Mersey Canal. One of the flashes here (Billinge Green Flash) has been turned into a marina.

Similarly, in Yorkshire, (Sprotborough Flash) is the result of magnesian limestone extraction. The flash was created around 1900, but in 1990, the Environment Agency turned the flash into an overflow lake for the River Don when it was under flood conditions. Several other flashes have been created or are created when the River Don is in spate. Other flashes from human interaction are at Fairburn Ings along the River Aire; these were caused by mining subsidence. Previously, the area around Fairburn had been a wetland in Medieval times, but was drained to provide agricultural land. The name ing itself means wet field, and alludes to its previous habitat before human intervention. Another flash in Yorkshire is at Catcliffe, which filled when sub-surface mining cause the land to drop, and be filled by water from the River Rother.

Several flashes occur in Hellifield in North Yorkshire, but theses are field ponds, which are the result of low lying land filling with water. The flashes at Hellifield are known for attracting a large variety of migratory wildfowl.

See also
Sandbach Flashes
Sprotbrough Flash
Glaze Brook
Pennington Flash Country Park

Notes

References

Sources

Bodies of water
Lakes by type